Karin Margareta Furuhed (born 9 May 1967 in Ovanåker, Gävleborg County) is a former freestyle swimmer from Sweden. She competed in the 1984 Summer Olympics and in the 1988 Summer Olympics. Her best individual result is a 24th place in the 50 m freestyle (1988).

Clubs
Borlänge SS

References
 

1967 births
Living people
People from Ovanåker Municipality
Swimmers at the 1984 Summer Olympics
Swimmers at the 1988 Summer Olympics
Olympic swimmers of Sweden
Borlänge SS swimmers
Swedish female freestyle swimmers
Sportspeople from Gävleborg County